Bigtyme Recordz, Vol. II: All Screwed Up is a remix album released by Houston producer DJ Screw in 1995.

Track listing

References

1995 remix albums
Remix albums by American artists
DJ Screw albums